Juan dela Cruz is the national personification of the Philippines, often used to represent the "Filipino everyman".

Juan dela Cruz may also refer to:

John of the Cross
Juan de la Cruz Band
Juan dela Cruz (TV series)
Juan de la Cruz (basketball)
Juan de la Cruz (actor)